Founded by Ray Finch in 1964, Finch is a car restoration company that also builds 1939 SS100 Jaguar and 1959 Ferrari Testa Rossa replicas. It is based in Mount Barker, South Australia.

The business was originally founded by Ray Finch in Mount Gambier, South Australia in 1965.

Four of the facilities are located next door to each other at Finch Restorations’ Mount Barker headquarters, while the Finch Powerhouse is located in Woodside and typically handles maintenance of customer cars, as well as things such as engine rebuilds and tuning.

References

External links
 Finch Restorations web site

Car manufacturers of Australia
Conservation and restoration of vehicles